R. S. Arumugam was an Indian politician.

Member of Legislative Assembly 
He was a Member of the Legislative Assembly.  He was elected to the Tamil Nadu Legislative Assembly as an Indian National Congress candidate from Gangaikondan constituency in 1962 election.

He was elected to the Tamil Nadu Legislative Assembly as an Indian National Congress candidate from Ottapidaram constituency in 1984 election.

Member of Parliament 
He was elected to 4th Lok Sabha from Tenkasi Lok Sabha constituency as an Indian National Congress candidate in 1967 Lok Sabha election. He lost the 1971 Lok Sabha election to A. M. Chellachami in the same constituency.

References 

Indian National Congress politicians from Tamil Nadu
Living people
India MPs 1967–1970
Madras MLAs 1962–1967
Lok Sabha members from Tamil Nadu
People from Tirunelveli district
Year of birth missing (living people)
Tamil Nadu MLAs 1985–1989